The 1998 Tennessee Volunteers football team represented the University of Tennessee in the 1998 NCAA Division I-A football season.  Tennessee entered the 1998 season coming off an 11–2 record (7–1 SEC) in 1997.  The Volunteers were given a preseason ranking of No. 10 in the AP Poll.

The Vols won their second undisputed national title, and sixth overall, after defeating Florida State in the Fiesta Bowl, the first BCS National Championship Game.  The '98 Vols beat eight bowl teams, including six January bowl teams, four top ten teams, and three BCS bowl-bound teams. The 1998 Tennessee Volunteers were ranked as the No. 3 college football team of all time by the Billingsley Report computer ratings.

Tennessee was expected to have a slight fall-off after their conference championship the previous season.  They had lost quarterback Peyton Manning, wide receiver Marcus Nash, and linebacker Leonard Little to the NFL.  Manning was the first pick overall in the 1998 NFL Draft, selected before Ryan Leaf.  Tennessee was also coming off a difficult 42–17 loss to Nebraska in the Orange Bowl, and were in the midst of a five-game losing streak to the rival Florida Gators.  Nonetheless, the Volunteers ended their season in Tempe with the school's first undefeated season in sixty years.

Captains
 FB Shawn Bryson
 PK Jeff Hall
 G Mercedes Hamilton
 LB Al Wilson
 QB Tee Martin

Schedule

Rankings

Roster

Game summaries

Syracuse

K Jeff Hall hit a 27 Yard field goal as time expired to give the Vols a key road win.  This was the second game winning kick of Hall's career (Georgia 1995). In his first game as a starter QB Tee Martin went only 9-of-26 for 143 yards, but led the Vols into field goal range for the final kick.  HB Jamal Lewis led the Vols with 140 yards rushing and a touchdown.  WR Peerless Price had two touchdown receptions. 

QB Donovan McNabb gave the Volunteer defense fits, putting up 300 yards with a 22-for-28 day

Florida

Tennessee broke a 5-game losing streak against the Gators.  Florida K Collins Cooper missed a FG in overtime and set off a wild celebration at Neyland Stadium that saw the goalposts and CBS cameras disappear.
The Vols won despite racking up only 235 yards of total offense.  The difference was turnovers.  The Florida Gators lost 4 fumbles, 2 caused by hits by Al Wilson.  K Jeff Hall made his field goal in the first overtime, setting the stage for the Florida miss and the Vols win.
The Vols also held the Gators to −13 net rushing on 30 attempts.  FB Shawn Bryson scored on a 57-yard run.

Houston

Junior QB Tee Martin had his coming-out party against the Houston Cougars, throwing for 4 touchdowns and 234 yards en route to the Vols win.  Jamal Lewis added 135 yards rushing and 1 touchdown, leading the Vols to 334 rushing yards and 589 total yards.
The Vols defense held Houston to 239 total yards and recorded 3 sacks with 8 tackles for loss.

Auburn

The Vols jumped out to an early lead behind the running of Jamal Lewis.  However, following a season ending ACL injury, Lewis left the game and the Tennessee Defense held on for the 17–9 win.

In a rematch of the high scoring 1997 SEC Championship Game, the Defense needed a score by DE Shaun Ellis and a 4 play goal line stand from inside the 1-yard line to secure the win.  They did so without senior captain Al Wilson, who missed the game with a shoulder injury.

Georgia

Tennessee entered their 3rd game in the 1998 SEC season as underdogs.  However, behind the running of substitute HB's Travis Henry and Travis Stephens, and a strong defensive effort, the Vols dominated the Bulldogs.

Georgia was limited to only 254 total yards and the Vols defense held their opponent without a touchdown for the second straight game.

Alabama

The Vols pushed their winning streak over Alabama to 4 games with a 35–18 victory.  The win gave Tennessee a 6–0 record for the first time since 1969, and also extended a streak for the Vols in the Third Saturday in October game.

This time, the Vols Offense relied on Travis Henry who rushed for 113 yards and 2 touchdowns.  The play that broke the game open for the Vols was a 100-yard kickoff return by Peerless Price in the 3rd quarter that answered an Alabama touchdown and two-point conversion.

South Carolina

Tee Martin set an NCAA record for consecutive completions with 24, leading the Vols to a 49–14 victory.  Martin completed his first 23 passes (with one from the previous game) to set the record.  He also recorded his first 300-yard passing game by going 23-for-24 for 315 yards and 4 touchdowns.

The Vol Defense held South Carolina scoreless until the 4th quarter, when they had a 42–0 lead.

UAB

Tennessee took care of the Blazers to win their homecoming contest and move their record to 8–0.  It was their first 8–0 start since 1956.
The Vols racked up 447 total yards, led by the rushing of Travis Henry and the passing of Tee Martin.  WR Peerless Price also added 103 yards receiving.

Arkansas

Tennessee fell behind 21–3 in the first half, but capped off a season-saving comeback with a Travis Henry touchdown run in the final seconds.

Henry had 197 yards rushing and the deciding touchdown.  The key play of the game and possibly the season occurred in the 4th quarter.  Arkansas was nursing a 24–22 lead late in the game and was attempting to run out the clock.  DT Billy Ratliff pushed Arkansas G Brandon Burlsworth into QB Clint Stoerner, causing him to stumble and fumble.  Ratliff recovered the ball and allowed Tennessee the chance to drive the field and score the game-winning touchdown.

Kentucky

Kentucky struggled after one of their players died and another was injured in an automobile accident early that week, as Tennessee picked up an easy 59–21 win.  This game marked the end of the Battle of the Beer Barrel, due to the alcohol-related death that week.

Kentucky QB Tim Couch passed for 337 yards and 2 touchdowns, but Kentucky never threatened after the 1st quarter

Vanderbilt

The Vols clinched their second consecutive SEC East Division title with a win in Nashville.  Tennessee dominated once again, holding the Commodores scoreless and limiting them to 174 total yards.

Tee Martin had 241 yards passing and 1 touchdown, while Travis Henry led the team in rushing with 136 yards and a touchdown.  Peerless Price added 181 yards receiving and a touchdown.

SEC Championship Game: Mississippi State

Tennessee won its second SEC title, in a defensive struggle.  The Vols were held to 249 total yards and scored 3 touchdowns. They were down late in the 4th quarter 14–10, but scored two touchdowns within 32 seconds of each other on passes by Tee Martin.  This win secured a berth into the National Championship game for the Vols.

Fiesta Bowl: Florida State

Tennessee won its first consensus National Championship since 1951 and the first ever BCS title game by defeating the Seminoles 23–16.  The second ranked Seminoles were favored and boasted superstar WR Peter Warrick.  The Vols limited Warrick to 1 catch for 7 yards and scored on long passes to Peerless Price and an interception return by CB Dwayne Goodrich, who was the defensive MVP of the game.  Price had 199 yards receiving on 4 catches and scored the deciding touchdown in the 4th quarter.

LB Al Wilson led the defense with 9 tackles.

Statistics
 QB Tee Martin: 164/285 (57.5%) for 2,442 yards (8.57) with 21 touchdowns vs. 8 interceptions (2.81%). 113 carries for 306 yards (2.71) and 7 touchdowns.
 RB Travis Henry: 195 carries for 998 yards (5.12) and 7 touchdowns. 5 catches for 40 yards and no touchdowns.
 RB Travis Stephens: 120 carries for 537 yards (4.48) and 4 touchdowns. 
 RB/FB Shawn Bryson: 24 carries for 207 yards (8.63) and 4 touchdowns. 22 catches for 201 yards and 2 touchdowns.
 RB Jamal Lewis: 73 carries for 497 yards (6.81) and 3 touchdowns.
 WR Peerless Price: 65 catches for 1,119 yards (17.22) and 11 touchdowns.
 WR Cedrick Wilson: 34 catches for 565 yards (16.62) and 6 touchdowns.
 WR Jeremaine Copeland: 29 catches for 455 yards (15.69) and 1 touchdown.

Honors 

 Phillip Fulmer:
 Eddie Robinson Award
 The Home Depot Coach of the Year Award
 SEC Coach of the Year

 David Cutcliffe:
 Broyles Award

 Al Wilson:
 Birmingham Quarterback Club – Most Outstanding SEC Lineman
 AP, AFCA, and FWAA 1st team All American
 'Football News', AP and Coaches 1st team All SEC

 Raynoch Thompson:
 AP 3rd team All American
 'Football News', AP and Coaches 1st team All SEC

 Chad Clifton:
 'Football News' 1st team All SEC
 AP and Coaches 2nd team All SEC

 Cosey Coleman
 AP 1st team All SEC
 Coaches 2nd team All SEC

 Dwayne Goodrich
 AP and Coaches 2nd team All SEC

 Jeff Hall
 'Football News', AP and Coaches 1st team All SEC

 Peerless Price
 AP and Coaches 2nd team All SEC

 Darwin Walker
 AP 1st team All SEC
 Coaches 2nd team All SEC

Team players drafted into the NFL

References:

References

Tennessee
Tennessee Volunteers football seasons
BCS National Champions
Southeastern Conference football champion seasons
Fiesta Bowl champion seasons
College football undefeated seasons
Tennessee Volunteers football